Daren Township is a mountain indigenous township in Taitung County, Taiwan. The main population is the Paiwan people of the Taiwanese aborigines.

History
In 2012, Daren, along with Wuqiu Township in Kinmen County (Quemoy), was proposed by the Ministry of Economic Affairs as the candidate of the new disposal site of nuclear waste after the Lanyu Storage Site in Orchid Island, Taitung County. This proposal however received heavy objection from the local Wuqiu residents.

Geography
 Area: 306.4454 km2
 Population: 3,472 people (as of February 2023)

Administrative divisions
The township comprises six villages: Anshuo, Nantan, Senyong, Sinhua, Taiban and Tuban.

Tourist attractions
 Dawu Keteleeria Nature Preservation Area
 Jinshueiying National Trail
 Nantian Coast Water Park
 Tjuwabal Paiwan Culture and Art Community

Transportation
The South-Link Highway passes through Daren Township, intersecting Highway 26 at Ansuo.

References

External links

 Darun Township Office

Townships in Taitung County